Anthony Morris Jr. (23 August 1654 – 24 October 1721) was a brewer, Quaker preacher, judge, and mayor of Philadelphia.

Note: Anthony Morris Jr. is denoted as Anthony Morris I resulting from the convention that he is the first Anthony Morris in the New World (despite being a Jr, and thus the second Anthony Morris). His son, Anthony, is known as the second Anthony Morris (in the New World) and also as Anthony Morris III.

Career 

Morris was born in Stepney, London. He emigrated to Burlington, New Jersey, in 1682, and relocated to Philadelphia three years later. In 1687, he built the original Morris Brewery, establishing a family business that would last until the 1830s. As the Francis Perot (and Sons) Malting Company, it endured into the 1960s as arguably the oldest continuous business in the United States. The original brewery was located on Front Street, south of Walnut. In 1745, Morris's grandson Anthony IV (son of the second Anthony Morris in Philadelphia) built a larger brewery at the corner of Dock and Pear (now Thomas Paine Place). At this location, Anthony IV's grandson, Benjamin Wistar Morris, brewed the preferred porter-style beer for President George Washington during the early 1790s.

In addition to serving Philadelphia as one of its leading brewers, Anthony Morris served in a variety of judicial capacities during the 1690s and was described by William Penn as "one of the most sufficient as well as diligent magistrates" in the colony. In 1704, Morris became the city's mayor, a post later occupied by his son Anthony III, as well. Most of the older Anthony's attention after the turn of the 18th century, however, was devoted to preaching among the Society of Friends throughout North America.

Morris was clerk of the Monthly Meeting for the Society of Friends in the late 17th century after he moved to Philadelphia. He also raised money for the construction of Philadelphia's Friends' Meeting Houses as well as contributing generously himself. 
He was active in the buying and selling of real estate which was one of his major business activities, judging by a compilation of land transfers which is in the Philadelphia archives office. He died in Philadelphia, aged 67.

References 
 Stanley Baron, Brewed in America: A History of Beer and Ale in the United States (Boston: Little, Brown and Company, 1962)
 James Grant Wilson, John Fiske and Stanley L. Klos, eds., Appleton's Cyclopedia of American Biography (New York: D. Appleton and Company, 1887–1889)

External links
 Excerpt from Baron's Brewed in America regarding colonial Pennsylvania brewers
 Morris properties at Dock and Pear in Philadelphia
 The Perot Family Papers, including Francis Perot (and Sons) Malting Company records, are available for research use at the Historical Society of Pennsylvania.

1654 births
1721 deaths
Mayors of Philadelphia
American Quakers
18th-century American judges
Converts to Quakerism
People of colonial Pennsylvania
People of colonial New Jersey
English emigrants
People from Stepney